Gold Coast Airport (formerly known as Coolangatta Airport)  is an international Australian airport located at the southern end of the Gold Coast and approximately  south of Brisbane, within the South East Queensland agglomeration. The entrance to the airport is situated in the suburb of Bilinga near Coolangatta. The runway itself cuts through the state borders of Queensland and New South Wales. During summer, these states are in two different time zones. The Gold Coast Airport operates on Queensland Time (year-round AEST / UTC+10).

For the 2015–16 financial year, Gold Coast Airport exceeded 6 million passengers. It is the seventh-busiest airport in Australia, and the busiest outside a state capital, in terms of passengers, and eighth-busiest in aircraft movements. It is also the third-fastest-growing airport in the country.

History
Until 1989, the airport was known as Coolangatta Airport. This is an Aboriginal word meaning "Place of Good View". It originally consisted (1936) of three grass strips with the intention of only providing an emergency landing ground for airmail aircraft transiting between Brisbane and Sydney. Passenger flights took off for the first time in 1939 using the then grassy field of the current Coolangatta site. Regular services were started by Queensland Airlines and Butler Air Transport after the Second World War. Ansett started its own services in 1950 using DC-3s, while Trans Australia Airlines did the same in 1954 using DC-3s, too, as well as DC-4s and Convairs to link other Australian cities.

By 1958, the taxiways and runways were fully paved, with the latter upgraded a decade later to allow jet operations with DC-9 and L-188 Electra aircraft to begin. The current terminal, known as the Eric Robinson Building, was officially opened in 1981 by Acting Prime Minister Douglas Anthony, when at the time more than 650,000 passengers were using the airport.

From 1 January 1988, the airport was managed by the Federal Airports Corporation on behalf of the Government. A decade later, on 29 May 1998, the airport was privatised via a long-term lease to Queensland Airports Limited (QAL). By 1999 the company's name had changed to become Gold Coast Airport Pty Ltd (GCAPL). 
The airport then suffered from the collapse of Ansett in 2001, as Ansett had operated direct services from the Gold Coast to 12 Australian destinations.

In 2003, GCAPL was taken over by QAL, which today also leases and operates Mount Isa Airport, Townsville Airport and Longreach Airport.

Despite the name change from Coolangatta Airport to Gold Coast Airport, the airport retains its original IATA code, OOL and ICAO code, YBCG. The Airport ownership remains with the Government of Australia.

In 1989, the airport welcomed its first international charter service from New Zealand, and by 1999 Air New Zealand low-cost subsidiary Freedom Air started scheduled no-frills service from Hamilton, New Zealand with Boeing 737s. In 2007 the airport celebrated the arrival of AirAsia X, which began services directly to Kuala Lumpur, Malaysia, and Tigerair Australia, which started services to Melbourne.  Subsequently, the airport has had flights from Air Pacific from Nadi, Fiji. Jetstar to Tokyo and Osaka. Services to New Zealand increased as well, with Jetstar, Air New Zealand and Pacific Blue flying to Auckland, Wellington and Christchurch. Airnorth also started services to the airport from Darwin, via Mount Isa. In addition, Virgin Blue announced direct services from Canberra and Townsville. This opened up connections between all three QAL-owned airports – Mount Isa Airport, Townsville Airport and Gold Coast Airport.

2010 saw Jetstar announce the airport as its newest hub, increased services to Cairns and new direct services to Perth (discontinued in 2013) and Queenstown. Tiger Airways also announced their newest base at Avalon Airport in Geelong, and said that services from Avalon to the Gold Coast would commence later in the year; however, services to Adelaide would be cut due to delays in receiving new aircraft which were intended for their new Avalon base.

On 26 October 2010, Gold Coast Airport was named the 2010 Major Airport of the Year 2010 by the Australian Airports Association (AAA).

The Gold Coast Airport served as the official airport of the 2018 Commonwealth Games.

Infrastructure

It is anticipated that a railway station will be constructed at the airport if the Gold Coast line is extended. In 2008, the Tugun Bypass opened and featured a tunnel under the runway.

The airport opened an extension to the main runway as well as a full-length parallel taxiway in May 2007.

On 16 May 2007, the runway extension was officially inaugurated by Deputy Prime Minister and Minister for Transport, Mark Vaile.

Gold Coast Airport appointed ADCO Constructions as the principal design and construct contractor for a $100-million redevelopment of the airport's main terminal. Completed in 2010, the project doubled the size of the existing facility to almost , incorporating domestic and international operations with self-service kiosks and 40 common-user check-in desks. The works will accommodate forecast growth for the next 10 years with a further expansion, stage two, scheduled to kick in upon demand. The main terminal – Terminal 1 – currently houses operations for Qantas, Jetstar, Virgin Australia, Rex, Air New Zealand and Scoot.

Seair Pacific, a scheduled and charter airline based at Gold Coast Airport, operate from their own hangar in the general aviation part of the airport.

An Instrument Landing System (ILS) was scheduled to be installed at the airport by June 2015 to enable planes to land during adverse weather conditions. It would be a Required navigation performance (RNP) system rather than a traditional ILS as this would allow planes to cross the coast at Currumbin rather than Surfers Paradise and therefore fly over fewer houses. The proposed ILS had become an issue with residents concerned with noise. On 25 January 2016 the Deputy Prime Minister and Minister for Infrastructure and Regional Development, Warren Truss, approved the installation of an ILS at Gold Coast Airport. Due to Ground contamination that was found at the ILS location, it will not be able to be installed before the Gold Coast 2018 Commonwealth Games.

Terminal Expansion 

2016 saw the commencement of Project LIFT an approximate $300 million upgrade featuring two new wide-bodied aircraft stands and a three-level terminal development with four aerobridges and improved ground transport facilities. It enabled up to 19 additional aircraft to take off and touch down.

In July 2019 work began on the 30,000 square metre southern terminal expansion. Infrastructure group Lendlease was appointed to deliver the project.

By August 2022 much of the expansion work was complete and 400 volunteers participated in a mass trial at the Gold Coast Airport's new terminal on 30 August 2022.

Lounges
Gold Coast Airport has two airline lounges: one, operated by Virgin Australia, has been operational since 30 May 2012, and is available to business class passengers, Virgin Australia lounge members, and Velocity Frequent Flyer Gold and Platinum members.  A Qantas Club has been operational at the airport as of 3 December 2012, and is available to business class passengers, Qantas Club members, and Qantas Frequent Flyer Gold and Platinum members.

Airlines and destinations

Passenger

The following airlines operate scheduled and in some cases chartered passenger flights from Gold Coast Airport. All passenger airlines operate flights from the main terminal (T1) with the exception of Seair Pacific, which operates from their own hangar in the general aviation part of the airport and Eastern Air Services which operates from the General Aviation apron.

Cargo
The following airlines operate scheduled cargo flights from Gold Coast Airport. 

Qantas Freight uses the cargo space of Jetstar aircraft to transport cargo domestically. It is also contracted for Jetstar international flights and Air New Zealand flights from the airport. It offers same day/overnight and standby services domestically airport to airport and airport to door from Gold Coast Airport. All cargo services operate from the Freight Terminal. Coast Cargo is a registered Cargo Terminal Operator (CTO) and currently handles Virgin Australia. It is also the agent for Toll Air Express.

Statistics

Public transportation

Road
The airport is located on the western side of the Gold Coast Highway, the terminal is 300 metres from the highway. The Gold Coast Highway passes through all the coastal suburbs of the city and is the most direct route to most of the major holiday destinations on the Gold Coast. The Pacific Motorway (M1) interchange is 1.5 km south of the airport. The Pacific Motorway connects the city to northern New South Wales, western suburbs and Brisbane City.

Public bus
All bus services are provided by Surfside Buslines.
Route 777 (northbound) -  Broadbeach South light rail station via Gold Coast Highway. This service is a limited stop, express service only. From there, passengers can connect to other bus services and the G:link.
760 (northbound) - Robina Town Centre via Varsity Lakes railway station and The Pines Shopping Centre. 
Route 760 (north & southbound) - Tweed Heads via Kirra and Coolangatta.

Airport shuttles
There are a number of private operators offering transfers between Gold Coast Airport and Brisbane. Scheduled transfers are available for arriving and departing passengers.

Train
The Gold Coast City Transport Strategy 2031 includes an extension of the G:link light rail to the airport, while the South East Queensland Infrastructure Plan and Program envisions extending the Gold Coast Line train line to the airport as well.  As of 2019, neither has been approved to begin construction.

Accidents and incidents

In March 1949, a Lockheed Lodestar aircraft became airborne at Bilinga airstrip for a flight to Archerfield Airport. Before reaching a height of  it stalled and crashed. All 21 occupants died in the crash or the ensuing conflagration. It was Queensland's worst civil aviation accident.

Awards 
The Gold Coast airport received the best airport award for customer experience at the 2018 National Airport Industry Awards hosted by the Australian Airports Association in Brisbane.

See also
 List of airports in Queensland
 Transport in Australia

References

External links

 Official website

Airports established in 1939
Airports in New South Wales
Airports in Queensland
Buildings and structures on the Gold Coast, Queensland
Transport on the Gold Coast, Queensland
1939 establishments in Australia
Tourism on the Gold Coast, Queensland
International airports in Australia